Dry Ridge is a home rule-class city in Grant County, Kentucky, in the United States. The population was 2,191 at the 2010 census, up from 1,995 at the 2000 census. From around 1910 to 1960, the city's economy was dominated by business related to its mineral water wells, purported to have healing properties.

Geography
Dry Ridge is located north of the center of Grant County at  (38.682242, -84.596370). It is bordered to the south by the city of Williamstown, the county seat. Interstate 75 passes through Dry Ridge, with access from Exit 159. I-75 leads north  to Cincinnati and south  to Lexington. U.S. Route 25 (Main Street) runs through the center of Dry Ridge, leading north  to Crittenden and south  to the center of Williamstown.

History
The community now known as Dry Ridge was settled about 1792 as "Campbell's Station" near a spring said to have medicinal qualities.

A post office called "Dry Ridge" was established in 1815 at an inn. Dry Ridge takes its name from a ridge surrounded by inns where travelers stopped for water before proceeding.

In 1909, the city was incorporated, the last incorporated in Grant County. That same year, a creamery company found mineral water which was believed to have medical properties. During the early part of the 20th century, Dry Ridge was the home of Kentucky Carlsbad Mineral Water Bottling Company, and home of the Carlsbad Hotel completed in 1911. People came to Dry Ridge from all over the eastern United States to take the mineral water of what was known as the Kentucky Carlsbad Springs, although it was not a spring, but a well. The hotel was destroyed by fire on February 25, 1927.

In 1937, a water distribution system was created with water from Williamstown, Kentucky's lake.

Demographics

As of the census of 2000, there were 1,995 people, 771 households, and 535 families residing in the city. The racial makeup of the city was 97.19% White, 0.55% African American, 0.10% Native American, 1.30% Asian, 0.20% from other races, and 0.65% from two or more races. Hispanic or Latino of any race were 0.70% of the population.

There were 771 households, out of which 39.7% had children under the age of 18 living with them, 46.4% were married couples living together, 18.2% had a female householder with no husband present, and 30.5% were non-families. 26.6% of all households were made up of individuals, and 12.1% had someone living alone who was 65 years of age or older. The average household size was 2.51 and the average family size was 3.00.

In the city, the population was spread out, with 28.6% under the age of 18, 11.1% from 18 to 24, 29.3% from 25 to 44, 18.9% from 45 to 64, and 12.1% who were 65 years of age or older. The median age was 31 years. For every 100 females, there were 87.3 males. For every 100 females age 18 and over, there were 83.0 males.

The median income for a household in the city was $30,647, and the median income for a family was $32,202. Males had a median income of $38,000 versus $23,000 for females. The per capita income for the city was $14,568. About 21.0% of families and 23.5% of the population were below the poverty line, including 39.0% of those under age 18 and 14.4% of those age 65 or over.

Education
Grant County students are served by Grant County Middle School and Grant County High School, both located in Dry Ridge.

Notable people
Lulu Vere Childers, African-American music educator
Skeeter Davis (Mary Frances Penick, 1931–2004), country-pop (or Nashville sound) singer best known for the song "The End of the World"

Climate
The climate in this area is characterized by hot, humid summers and generally mild to cool winters. According to the Köppen Climate Classification system, Dry Ridge has a humid subtropical climate, abbreviated "Cfa" on climate maps.

References

External links
 City of Dry Ridge official website
 Historical Texts and Images of Dry Ridge

Cities in Kentucky
Cities in Grant County, Kentucky